Giuseppe Azzaro (15 October 1925 – 5 June 2022) was an Italian politician.

Biography
A member of the Christian Democracy party, he served in the Chamber of Deputies from 1963 to 1992. He was also Mayor of Catania from 1987 to 1988 and again in 1991.

Azzaro died in Rome on 5 June 2022 at the age of 96.

References

1925 births
2022 deaths
20th-century Italian politicians
Christian Democracy (Italy) politicians
Deputies of Legislature IV of Italy
Deputies of Legislature V of Italy
Deputies of Legislature VI of Italy
Deputies of Legislature VII of Italy
Deputies of Legislature VIII of Italy
Deputies of Legislature IX of Italy
Deputies of Legislature X of Italy
Mayors of Catania